Dark Christmas is the ninth overall album (first Christmas album) by Abney Park.

Track listing
"Little Drummer Boy"
"Winter Wonderland"
"Dance of the Sugarplum Fairies"
"Carol Of The Bells"
"Rudolf"
"God Rest Ye Merry, Gentlemen"
"Good King Wenceslas"
"Coventry Carol"
"We Three Kings"
"Silent Night"

References

Abney Park (band) albums
2009 Christmas albums